Verkh-Lel (Vylïś Ľoľ) is a rural locality (a settlement) in Chazyovskoye Rural Settlement, Kosinsky District, Perm Krai, Russia. The population was 117 as of 2010. There are 5 streets.

Geography 
Verkh-Lel is located 25 km northwest of Kosa (the district's administrative centre) by road. Sosnovka is the nearest rural locality.

References 

Rural localities in Kosinsky District